The 2008 Belarusian Premier League was the 18th season of top-tier football in Belarus. It started on April 6 and ended on November 16, 2008. BATE Borisov were the defending champions.

Team changes from 2007 season
Due to league expansion from 14 to 16 teams the only relegated team Minsk, who finished last in 2007, was replaced by three best teams of 2007 First League: Savit Mogilev, Granit Mikashevichi and Lokomotiv Minsk.

Overview
BATE Borisov won their 5th champions title and qualified for the next season's Champions League. The championship runners-up Dinamo Minsk, bronze medalists MTZ-RIPO Minsk and 2008–09 Cup winners Naftan Novopolotsk qualified for the inaugural tournament of Europa League. Due to decision to gradually reduce Premiere League to 12 clubs (14 in 2009, 12 in 2010) three lowest placed teams (Lokomotiv Minsk, Savit Mogilev and Darida Minsk Raion) relegated to the First League. The two latter teams disbanded prior to 2009 season.

Teams and venues

Table

Results

Belarusian clubs in European Cups

Top scorers

See also
2008 Belarusian First League
2007–08 Belarusian Cup
2008–09 Belarusian Cup

References

External links
 Official site 
 rsssf.com

Belarusian Premier League seasons
1
Belarus
Belarus